Haji Abdul Khair bin Haji Basri (born 5 January 1996) is a Bruneian international footballer who plays for Indera SC. Predominantly a central midfielder, his attributes and versatility also allows him to play as a centre-back or as a forward when required.

Club career
Khair is a graduate of Projek Ikan Pusu (PIP), a successful local grassroots football scheme that also produced Brunei internationals such as Yura Indera Putera Yunos and Aman Abdul Rahim. He moved to Indera SC in 2013, and won the first ever Brunei Super League championship.

Khair was captain of Tabuan Muda, a league team that was formed by the NFABD to prepare for international competitions. They finished fifth in the 2015 and 2016 seasons of the Bruneian top flight.

After taking time off for studies in 2017, he re-signed for Indera in early 2018, appearing at the 4–1 win over IKLS FC in the FA Cup.

International career
Khair was a member of the Brunei under-21 team that played in the 2014 Hassanal Bolkiah Trophy. He made his sole appearance in the final group game against Malaysia where despite winning the match 2–1, the home side failed to advance to the semi-final stage on goal difference.

A year later, Khair travelled with the under-23s for the 2016 AFC U-23 Championship qualification held in Indonesia in late March 2015. However, he missed out on the squad for the 28th SEA Games held in May.

Khair made his full international debut on 6 June 2015 versus Singapore in a friendly match that finished 5–1 against Brunei. He was selected for the 2016 AFF Suzuki Cup qualification matches held in Cambodia in October. He made substitute appearances in the last two group games against Cambodia and Laos.

Personal life

Abdul Khair has a footballing brother, Abdul Syakir who has been called up to the full national team.

References

External links
 
 

Living people
Bruneian footballers
Brunei international footballers
1996 births
Association football midfielders
Indera SC players